If the Shoe Fits is the fourth studio album by American country rock band Pure Prairie League, released in 1976.

In addition to the usual 2-channel stereo version the album was also released by RCA Records in a 4-channel quadraphonic sound version in 1976.

The album was reissued in 2017 on hybrid Super Audio CD by Dutton Vocalion. This edition was remastered from the original master tapes and contains both the original stereo and quadraphonic mixes. The disc is a 2 on 1 release, also containing the band's 1975 album "Two Lane Highway".

It was recorded at the Record Plant, Sausalito and Los Angeles and Capitol Studios, Hollywood.

Track listing
Side one
"That'll Be the Day" (Jerry Allison, Buddy Holly, Norman Petty)
"I Can Only Think of You" (L Goshorn, Reilly)
"Sun Shone Lightly" (Tim Goshorn)
"Long Cold Winter" (L Goshorn, Powell, Reilly)
"Lucille Crawfield" (Powell)
Side two
"Gimme Another Chance" (L Goshorn)
"Aren't You Mine" (Hinds, Powell)
"You Are So Near to Me" (Powell)
"Out in the Street" (L Goshorn)
"Goin' Home" (L Goshorn)

Personnel
Pure Prairie League
John David Call - banjo, dobro, steel guitar
Michael Connor - keyboards
Larry Goshorn - guitar
Billy Hinds - drums
George Ed Powell - guitar, vocals
Michael Reilly - bass
Production
Producer: John Boylan
Engineer: Paul Grupp
Mastered: Wally Traugott

Charts

Album
Billboard (United States)

Singles
Billboard (United States)

References

Pure Prairie League albums
1976 albums
Albums produced by John Boylan (record producer)
RCA Records albums